"Toto" is a song by New Zealand band Drax Project. Inspired by vocalist Shaan Singh quitting their full-time jobs to pursue music, "Toto" was released as the second single from the Noon EP in August 2018. The song was a commercial success, becoming platinum certified in New Zealand.

Background and composition

The song was written by the band the day after the band members quit their full-time jobs to pursue music. While not directly inspired by the 1982 song "Africa" by Toto, the band references "Africa" in the song's lyrics, and wanted to recreate the same joyfulness present in "Africa". The first stanza of the song's lyrics are a direct quote by vocalist Shaan Singh, who was describing his day to a friend. The band performed the song live before deciding on a finished version of the song's lyrics. Due to a fan's strong response to the song, the band were convinced to leave the song as it was, and release the song on the Noon EP.

Release

The song was first unveiled as a track on the Noon EP, which was released on 8 June 2018. A month later on 13 August, the song was announced as the band's next single. "Toto" was later featured in the band's debut album Drax Project. A music video was produced for the song, a dance rehearsal video made in collaboration with Samsung, that does not feature members of the band.

The single climbed the charts in October 2018, and was certified platinum in 2019.

Credits and personnel

Credits adapted from Tidal.

Devin Abrams – producer
Matt Beachen – drums, songwriter
Simon Gooding – engineer
Stuart Hawkes – mastering engineer
Ben O'Leary – bass guitar, songwriter
Sam Thomson – bass (vocal), songwriter
Shaan Singh – vocals, songwriting

Charts

Weekly charts

Year-end charts

Certifications

References

2018 singles
2018 songs
Drax Project songs
New Zealand songs